Mirto (Sicilian: Mirtu) is a comune (municipality) in the Metropolitan City of Messina in the Italian region Sicily, located about  east of Palermo and about  west of Messina.

Mirto borders the following municipalities: Capo d'Orlando, Capri Leone, Frazzanò, Naso, San Salvatore di Fitalia.

People
 Francesco Cupani (1657–1710)

References

Cities and towns in Sicily